Longxi may refer to the following locations in China:

 Longxi Commandery, a historical prefecture from the Qin to the Tang dynasty
 Longxi County (陇西县), Gansu
 Longxi County, Fujian (龙溪县), former county, now part of Longhai City as Longhai District
 Longxi Station, station of Guangfo Metro Line 1 of Guangzhou Metro, Guangdong
Towns (龙溪镇)
Longxi, Wushan County, Chongqing
Longxi, Guangdong, in Boluo County
Longxi, Guizhou, in Yuqing County
Longxi, Shaoyang, in Wugang, Hunan
Longxi, Jiangxi, in Linchuan District, Fuzhou
Longxi, Shanxi, in Pingshun County

Townships (龙溪乡)
Longxi Township, Chongqing, in Pengshui Miao and Tujia Autonomous County
Longxi Township, Lezhi County, Sichuan
Longxi Township, Wenchuan County, Sichuan
Longxi Township, Yibin, in Pingshan County, Sichuan
Longxi Township, Lishui, in Qingyuan County, Zhejiang
Longxi Township, Tiantai County, Zhejiang
Longxi Township, Yuhuan County, Zhejiang